The Old Military Road site near Talahina, Oklahoma is a segment of the historic military road built in 1832 from Fort Smith, Arkansas to Fort Towson, Oklahoma.  The road opened a means for commerce and otherwise facilitated development of the Oklahoma Territory.

The War Department and the Bureau of Indian Affairs jointly developed the road.  A Captain John Stuart directed it.  The route was laid out by frontiersman Robert Bean who had a young Jesse Chisholm assisting.

References

National Register of Historic Places in Le Flore County, Oklahoma
Buildings and structures completed in 1832
LeFlore County, Oklahoma